Axel Javier Fernández Berón (born 3 September 1994) is a Uruguayan footballer who plays as a forward for Rocha in the Uruguayan Primera División Amateur.

Career

Plaza Colonia
Fernández began his professional career with then-Uruguayan Segunda División club Plaza Colonia, graduating from the club's youth system in 2014. He made his league debut for the club on 19 April 2014, coming on as a 70th-minute substitute for Facundo Waller in a 1–1 draw with Rocha. He scored his first goal for the club the following season as part of a brace in a 3–0 victory over Huracán.

Career statistics

Club

References

External links

1994 births
Living people
Plaza Colonia players
Rocha F.C. players
Uruguayan Primera División players
Uruguayan Segunda División players
Uruguayan footballers
Association football forwards